Curtis Creek El School District is a public school district based in Tuolumne County, California.

References

External links
 

School districts in California